Marco Manetta (born 14 July 1991) is an Italian professional footballer who plays as a centre back for  club Taranto.

Career
Born in Tivoli, Manetta was formed as a player in Lazio and Frosinone youth sector. As a Senior, he played for Serie D and Lega Pro Seconda Divisione clubs.

Serie C
On 12 August 2018, he moved to Serie C club Cavese. Manetta made his Serie C debut on 22 September against Virtus Francavilla.

On 25 July 2019, he joined to Fermana. In August 2020, he extended his contract by a year.

On 23 July 2021, he signed with Vis Pesaro.

References

External links
 
 

1991 births
Living people
People from Tivoli, Lazio
Footballers from Lazio
Sportspeople from the Metropolitan City of Rome Capital
Italian footballers
Association football central defenders
Serie C players
Lega Pro Seconda Divisione players
Serie D players
S.S. Lazio players
Frosinone Calcio players
Matera Calcio players
Paganese Calcio 1926 players
Olbia Calcio 1905 players
A.C. Isola Liri players
Potenza Calcio players
A.C.R. Messina players
Cavese 1919 players
Fermana F.C. players
Vis Pesaro dal 1898 players
Taranto F.C. 1927 players